The Commission on Wartime Contracting in Iraq and Afghanistan was an independent, bipartisan commission of the United States government established in 2008 to study government contracting related to the Afghanistan War and the Iraq War. Headline findings included over $30bn waste and fraud identified along with further potential losses through unsustainable projects.

The commission closed on September 30, 2011 in accordance with statutory sunset provisions.

Background
The establishment of the Commission on Wartime Contracting in Iraq and Afghanistan was a response to allegations that billions of dollars had been misappropriated in Afghanistan and in Iraq. In response to these allegations, on July 18, 2007, Senators Jim Webb (D—VA) and Claire McCaskill (D—MO) introduced a bill to create a commission modeled after the Truman Committee, which oversaw government contracting during World War II. Rep. John F. Tierney (D—MA-6) introduced a similar bill in the House in September 2007. These bills were subsequently endorsed by the Project on Government Oversight, Taxpayers for Common Sense, the Government Accountability Project, OMB Watch, Common Cause, the Public Interest Research Group, and Iraq and Afghanistan Veterans of America.

This bill was passed as part of the National Defense Authorization Act for Fiscal Year 2008, which was signed into law by President George W. Bush on January 28, 2008.

Membership
By statute, the commission was bipartisan and made up of commissioners appointed by bipartisan officeholders. The following chart indicates the make-up of the commission.

Findings
The Commission summarized its findings in its final report as:
Contractors represent more than half of the U.S. presence in the contingency operations in Iraq and Afghanistan, at times employing more than a quarter-million people. They have performed vital tasks in support of U.S. defense, diplomatic, and development objectives. But the cost has been high. Poor planning, management, and oversight of contracts has led to massive waste and has damaged these objectives. The volume and complexity of contract actions have overwhelmed the ability of government to plan for, manage, and oversee contractors in theater. Contracting decisions made during urgent contingencies have often neglected the need to determine whether host-nation governments can or will sustain the many projects and programs that U.S. contracts have established in their countries.

External links
Homepage of the Commission on Wartime Contracting in Iraq and Afghanistan

Notes

References

United States national commissions
Iraq War
War in Afghanistan (2001–2021)